The Chariton Review is an American literary magazine based at Truman State University in Kirksville, Missouri.  The journal was founded in 1975 by Andrew Grossbart.  Jim Barnes was the editor from 1976 to 2010.

Work that has appeared in Chariton Review has been short-listed for the Best American Poetry Series and The Pushcart Prize.

Among established writers whose work has appeared in The Chariton Review are David Wagoner, Michael Pettit, James Sallis, Ann Pancake, Gordon Weaver, Jacob Appel and David Lawrence.

See also
List of literary magazines

References

External links
 The Chariton Review

Poetry magazines published in the United States
Biannual magazines published in the United States
Magazines established in 1975
Truman State University
1975 establishments in Missouri
Magazines published in Missouri